An Imaginary Tale is a 1990 Canadian drama film directed by André Forcier. The film was selected as the Canadian entry for the Best Foreign Language Film at the 63rd Academy Awards, but was not accepted as a nominee.

Plot
Toni (Nardi) is the director of a staged rendition of Othello in Montreal. It is a pet project of his, financed by his mafia uncle. Unbeknownst to him, the audiences are also rounded up and paid by the same uncle. Some of them have seen every performance of this tragic play, and are understandably bored, so when the backstage romantic events of the actors result in absurd situations onstage, the audience is delighted. There are a huge number of romantic situations going on in this film at the same time. One of them involves Gaston (Lapointe), a somewhat world-weary jazz musician, and Florence (Marleau), a glamorous middle-aged woman who has been pining for him for years. Another involves two members of the musician's jazz trio. Yet another involves the play's Desdemona, Soledad (Laurier), the girlfriend of the man playing Othello, who can't keep his hands off his dresser. She is also Florence's niece.

Recognition
 1991
 Genie Award for Best Achievement in Direction - André Forcier - Nominated
 Genie Award for Best Motion Picture - Claudio Luca, Robin Spry - Nominated
 Genie Award for Best Original Screenplay - Jacques Marcotte, André Forcier - Nominated
 1990
 Montreal World Film Festival Most Popular Film - André Forcier - Nominated - Won
 Sudbury Cinefest Best Canadian Film - André Forcier - Won

See also
 List of submissions to the 63rd Academy Awards for Best Foreign Language Film
 List of Canadian submissions for the Academy Award for Best Foreign Language Film

References

External links
 
 

1990 films
1990 drama films
1990s French-language films
Films based on Othello
Films set in Montreal
Films directed by André Forcier
Canadian drama films
1990s Canadian films
French-language Canadian films